If Swallowed, Do Not Induce Vomiting is  a 12" EP by Budgie released in July 1980 on Active Records, a sublabel of RCA. 

The 1993 Repertoire Records and 1996 Griffin Music CD re-issues of Power Supply included the EP as bonus tracks.  In 2012, the EP was issued on CD by Noteworthy Productions with live versions of "High School Girls" and "Panzer Division Destroyed" as bonus tracks.

Track listing

Personnel
Budgie
Burke Shelley - vocals, bass
John Thomas - guitar
Steve Williams - drums

References

1980 EPs
Budgie (band) EPs